The Subanen languages (also Subanon and Subanun) are a group of closely related Austronesian languages belonging to the Greater Central Philippine subgroup. Often described as a single language, they are considered by linguists as a dialect cluster more than a monolithic language. Subanen languages are spoken in various areas of Zamboanga Peninsula, namely the provinces of Zamboanga Sibugay, Zamboanga del Norte and Zamboanga del Sur, and in Misamis Occidental of Northern Mindanao. There is also a sizeable Subanen community in Misamis Oriental. Most speakers of Subanen languages go by the name of Subanen, Subanon or Subanun, while those who adhere to Islam refer to themselves as Kalibugan.

Internal classification
Jason Lobel (2013:308) classifies the Subanen varieties as follows.

Subanen
Western
Western Subanon
Western Kolibugan
Nuclear
West Nuclear
Tawlet-Kalibugan Subanen
Salug-Godod Subanen
East Nuclear
Southern Subanen
Central Subanen
Northern Subanen
Eastern Subanen

Lobel (2013:308) lists the following innovations among each of the following subgroups.
Nuclear Subanen: *k > Ø
Western Subanen: *k > /k/
East Nuclear Subanen: *r > /l/
West Nuclear Subanen: *r > /r/
Western Subanen: *r > /l/ (independently took place, likely due to contact with Tausug, Maguindanaon, Butuanon, Cebuano, and/or Ilonggo, which have also undergone the *r > /l/ shift independently of one another)

Proto-Subanen

The following phoneme inventory can be reconstructed for Proto-Subanen:

According to Jason Lobel (2013:304-305), the innovations defining Proto-Subanen from Proto-Greater Central Philippine are:

1. *h was lost in all positions in Proto-Subanen.

2. *ʔ was lost word-initially and word-medially, only being retained in word-final position.

3. Reduction of *a to *ə in prepenultimate syllables, as well as in closed penultimate syllables.

4. Addition of a word-initial *g- to all vowel-initlal words following the operation of the previous innovations.

5. Assimilation of consonant clusters into a sequence of either *kC, *gC, or a nasal cluster.

References

External links 
 "Subanon" at Ethnologue (23rd ed, 2020).
 Audio recordings of Subanon are archived with Kaipuleohone, including a word list, sentences, and a traditional song

Greater Central Philippine languages
Languages of Zamboanga del Sur
Languages of Zamboanga del Norte
Languages of Zamboanga Sibugay
Languages of Misamis Occidental